The 2015–16 Football Superleague of Kosovo was the sixteenth season of football in Kosovo. The season began on 22 August 2015 and ended on 22 May 2016; the relegation play-offs were on 1/2 June 2016. Feronikeli were the defending champions.

A total of 12 teams competed in the league: nine sides from the 2014–15 season and three promoted from the Liga e Parë campaign. Liria, Gjilani and Llapi were each promoted to the top-flight.

Teams

League table

With Kosovo's admittance to FIFA and UEFA on 3 May 2016, UEFA evaluated the Raiffeisen Superliga's readiness to enter the UEFA Champions League for its 2016–17 season. Later, UEFA decided not to allow them to play in the Champions League just yet.

Results

Matches 1–22

Matches 23–33

Relegation play-offs

The ninth and tenth-placed teams (Drenica and Drita respectively) played the third and fourth-placed teams (Flamurtari and Dukagjini respectively) from the 2015–16 Liga e Parë; the two winners will play in the top-flight next season.

References

External links
 Kosovo Superliga at Soccerway

Football Superleague of Kosovo seasons
Kosovo
Super